Some Cities Live is the first digital download-only release from Doves. It was made available worldwide in April 2006. Each song was recorded at a different venue throughout the band's December 2005 UK tour dates, except for "Where We're Calling From"/"Pounding," which was recorded in New York in September 2005.

Track listing

References

2006 EPs
Doves (band) albums
Heavenly Recordings EPs